Dominique Pandor (born 15 May 1993) is a Martiniquais professional footballer who plays as an attacking midfielder for Championnat National 2 club Andrézieux-Bouthéon FC.

Career
In January 2019, Pandor moved to Sedan. He left the club at the end of the season and was without club until 9 December 2019, where he signed with Championnat National club Gazélec Ajaccio on a deal for the rest of the season with an option for one further year. In July 2020, he moved to Championnat National 2 club Les Herbiers.

References

External links 
 
 
 
 

1993 births
Living people
People from La Trinité, Martinique
Association football midfielders
Martiniquais footballers
Martinique international footballers
French footballers
France youth international footballers
French people of Martiniquais descent
Championnat National 2 players
Ligue 2 players
Championnat National 3 players
Championnat National players
La Gauloise de Trinité (football) players
AS Monaco FC players
Stade Brestois 29 players
US Boulogne players
CS Sedan Ardennes players
CA Bastia players
Stade Lavallois players
Gazélec Ajaccio players
Les Herbiers VF players
Andrézieux-Bouthéon FC players
2014 Caribbean Cup players
Martiniquais expatriate footballers
French expatriate footballers
French expatriate sportspeople in Monaco
Expatriate footballers in Monaco